A nerve fascicle,  is a bundle of nerve fibers belonging to a nerve in the peripheral nervous system. A nerve fascicle is also called a fasciculus. A nerve fascicle is enclosed by perineurium, a layer of fascial connective tissue. Each enclosed nerve fiber in the fascicle is enclosed by a connective tissue layer of endoneurium. Bundles of nerve fascicles are called fasciculi and are constituents of a nerve trunk. A main nerve trunk may contain a great many fascicles enclosing many thousands of axons. 

In the central nervous system (CNS) a bundle of nerve fibers is called a nerve tract, and in neuroanatomy different tracts in the spinal cord are bundled into fasciculi such as the medial longitudinal fasciculus. In the spinal cord fasciculi are bundled into columns called funiculi such as the anterior funiculus.

See also
 Epineurium
 Nervous tissue

References

External links
  - "PNS, nerve (LM, Low)"
 Histology at neurobio.ucla.edu

Neurohistology